Göksel Demirpençe (born 25 November 1971) is a Turkish singer-songwriter.

Biography
Göksel was born in Istanbul on 25 November 1971. In 1988 she applied to Boğaziçi University to study philosophy. However, she quit her studies to become a professional musician. She started to take private singing lessons and began singing for various orchestras. For two years she was a backing vocalist to Sezen Aksu and Sertab Erener, two of Turkey's most acknowledged female singers.

In September 1997, her first album, entitled Yollar (Roads), was released, of which the first single, "Sabır" (Patience), became a hit.

She released her second album, Körebe (Blind Man's Bluff), in October 2001 under a Sony Music label. Its most successful single was "Depresyondayım" (I'm depressed).

Her third album came out in May 2003 under the title Söz Ver (Promise).  That year Göksel gave a successful concert in Babylon with the Greek band, Omega Vibes.

In March 2005, Göksel published her latest album, Arka Bahçem (My Backyard).  The album's biggest hit was "Bi seni konuşurum" (I'm only talking about you).

Göksel is also featured in the album of Turkish rock band maNga; their duet called "Dursun zaman" (Time should stop) is popular with radio stations and appears on the soundtrack of the film Sınav (starring Jean-Claude Van Damme).

Göksel's fifth album, entitled Ay'da Yürüdüm  (I Walked on the Moon), was released on 13 April 2007. The first single is titled "Yarabbi Şükür" (Thanks God). The album features a duet with Ferman Akgül, the singer of maNga and renowned Turkish rock star Teoman. The song's title is "Taş Bebek" (Doll) and according to Göksel, the song was written (together with Akgül, Alper Erinç and Teoman) to show how much the women have to suffer to be always beautiful. Göksel states that women are designed to do much more useful things than just dolling themselves up for the sake of men, so she wrote this song to remind women that beauty lies inside and not in clothes or make-up.

She released her sixth studio album Mektubumu Buldun mu? (Did you find my letter?) in May 2009, in which she performed covers of popular Turkish songs. In September 2009, her previous company released a compilation best-of album, which allegedly released without artist's permission.

On 28 April 2010 Göksel released her second covers album, seventh over all, called "Hayat Rüya Gibi". She did a cover of "Paroles Paroles" (Dalida) named "Palavra" (Lies) and a ballad with the name of "Tek Başına" (Alone).

In 2018, Göksel collaborated with electronic musician Hey Douglas to create a song called "Duruyor Dünya" (The world is stopping).

Discography

Albums

Singles

Charts

Music videos

Filmography

Notes

External links 
  Göksel's official website

1971 births
Living people
Folk rock musicians
Singers from Istanbul
Turkish pop musicians
Turkish women singer-songwriters
21st-century Turkish women singers